Carlos Félix Gámez (born May 14, 1991, in Cajeme, Sonora) is a Mexican professional footballer.

References

1991 births
Living people
Association football forwards
Murciélagos FC footballers
Ascenso MX players
Liga Premier de México players
Tercera División de México players
Footballers from Sonora
Mexican footballers